was a Japanese botanist and specialist in the Salicaceae, or willow family. He was a professor of botany at the University of Tokyo and at Tohoku University. Kimura was also the first director of the Botanical Garden of Tohoku University. A species of spider, Heptathela kimurai, was named in his honour.

References 

20th-century Japanese botanists
Academic staff of Tohoku University
University of Tokyo alumni
Kagoshima University alumni
People from Ishikawa Prefecture
1900 births
1996 deaths